Shiguai District or Xiguit District (Mongolian:   Siɣuyitu toɣoriɣ, Шугуйт тойрог)  is an outlying district of Baotou, the largest city of Inner Mongolia, People's Republic of China.

The district is home to Badekar Monastery and the national park that surrounds it.

References

www.xzqh.org

External links
 

County-level divisions of Inner Mongolia